Ambitious about Autism is a UK national charity which aims to improve opportunities for young people on the Autistic Spectrum, including those with autism or Asperger syndrome. Originally established in 1997 as the TreeHouse Trust, the charity was founded by a group of parents – including author Nick Hornby – whose first child had been diagnosed with autism.

Their mission has been described as being to "help children and young people with autism to learn, thrive and achieve –  making the ordinary possible."

It is known for operating TreeHouse School in Muswell Hill, north London, Ambitious College which has campuses in Tottenham and Isleworth, London and The Rise School, based in Feltham, west London.

TreeHouse School was rated 'Outstanding' by Ofsted in its 2017 inspection.

History

TreeHouse Trust
The charity was originally known as the TreeHouse Trust and began the school, with five pupils, in a borrowed room in the Royal Free Hospital in London. In 2004 the school moved to Muswell Hill, also in London, and in October 2008 moved into a purpose designed building – the Pears National Centre for Autism Education.

The Pears National Centre for Autism education
Officially opened in 2009, the centre became home to both the TreeHouse School and the charity. It was designed by British architects Penoyre & Prasad who also designed the Richard Desmond Children's Eye Centre at Moorfields Eye Hospital. It was named for the Pears Foundation, a major supporter.

Ambitious about Autism
An event at the House of Lords on 10 February 2010 it was announced that TreeHouse Trust would be renamed Ambitious about Autism. Aside from a new identity, it marked a change in the strategy of the charity. The school – still to be known as TreeHouse School – had a permanent home, with pupils' places mainly funded by their Local Education Authority, but there was still much to achieve in raising awareness and understanding of autism, the provision of a wider range of services and the influencing of UK Government policy.

Campaigning for change
An example of their desire to influence policy is the 'Finished at School' campaign, which aims to change the facts that less than one in four children with autism in the UK go on to Further education and that ~85% of adults with autism are unemployed. The campaign began in October 2011 with the launch of a self-named report, with a foreword by Robert Buckland MP. Subtitled "Where next for young people with autism?", it called for the British Government to create "A clear legal right to educational support up to the age of 25 years for young disabled people".

The Finished at School campaign was supported by an Early Day Motion in the House of Commons entitled "That this House believes that young people with autism need more effective education options once they finish school in order to allow them to access work, live more independently and break the cycle of dependency; and supports the Finished at School campaign run by Ambitious about Autism...". 55 MPs signed in support of the motion.

In 2018, the charity launched a campaign called We Need An Education to raise awareness about the number of children and young people with autism missing from the UK's education system. The charity's Youth Patrons hosted a debate in the Clothworkers' Hall in London where they shared their experiences of school. The charity also commissioned a survey of parents of pupils with autism, which found that a third of parents had been forced to give up their job after their children were excluded from school.

Talk about Autism
The charity runs the online autism community Talk about Autism as part of its mission to support families and individuals affected by the condition.

Patrons
The following are Parent Patrons of the charity. There are also a number of Youth Patrons.

 John Bercow
 Sally Bercow
 Nicky Clark
 Matthew Davis
 Keith Duffy
 Eliza Mishcon
 Charlotte Moore
 Claire Ryan
Sophie Walker

In 2011, Sally Bercow donated £100,000 from a TV appearance on Channel 5 to Ambitious about Autism.

Ambassadors
 Luke Treadaway 
 Sarah Cawood
 Michelle Collins
 Jonny Gould
 Jon Snow
 Hayley Ronson
David Mitchell 
Kathy Lette 
Jules Robertson
Niamh Cusack 
Simon and Lucy Mottram

Leadership
The charity's president is Lord Tim Clement-Jones CBE. He is supported by several vice-presidents, including Nick Hornby. The Chief Executive is Jolanta Lasota.

References

External links
 ambitiousaboutautism.org.uk – official website.
 talkaboutautism.org.uk – online autism community.
 treehouseschool.org.uk – TreeHouse School homepage.

Autism-related organisations in the United Kingdom
Organizations established in 1997
Education in London
Special education in the United Kingdom
Medical and health organisations based in London
Educational charities based in the United Kingdom
Organizations for children with health issues
1997 establishments in the United Kingdom
Charities for disabled people based in the United Kingdom